Reino Vilho (Wilhelm) Silvanto (until 1929 Sylvander; 21 February 1883, in Helsinki – 29 January 1943, in Helsinki) was Finnish diplomat and author. He used pen names as R.W.S, Reino Silva ja Reino Silvala as he was translator.

Silvano's parents were carpenter Karl Kristoffer Sylvander and Elviira Kallentytär. He graduated from Helsinki in 1903 and graduated from the University of Helsinki to Bachelor of Philosophy in 1908 and master's degree in 1910.

Silvanto was initially a teacher at various educational establishments in Helsinki, Forssa and Kotka. He was employed by the Finnish News Agency in 1918 and then served as a Head of the Department of the Sarkanen & Helmee's lawfirm in 1918–1920.

Reino Silvanto served as Finland's representative in Latvia since 1920 and Envoy of Finland to Latvia in 1926–1927. Silvanto left for Foreign Affairs in 1929 and later worked as a writer and translator in Helsinki.

Silvanto translated Polish, Czech and Russian literature to Finnish (Anton Chekhov, Nikolai Gogol, Maksim Gorky, Henryk Sienkiewicz, Władysław Reymont, Karel Čapek). He also wrote Sammatti's history and published two new Polish prose presenting anthologies: Young Poland (1916) and White Eagle (1937).

Silvanto had been married to Olga Saastamoinen since 1912.

Diplomats from Helsinki
Finnish translators
Writers from Helsinki
1883 births
1943 deaths
20th-century translators